The 1880 Wellington City mayoral election was part of the New Zealand local elections held that same year to decide who would take the office of Mayor of Wellington.

Background
Incumbent mayor William Hutchison sought re-election and was returned for another term. His opponents were city councillors Andrew Young and Dr. Henry William Driver as well as American born auctioneer Thomas C. Dwan.

Election results
The following table gives the election results:

Notes

References

Mayoral elections in Wellington
1880 elections in New Zealand
Politics of the Wellington Region
1880s in Wellington
November 1880 events